Jean Dixon (born Jean Jacques; July 14, 1893 – February 12, 1981) was an American stage and film actress.

Early years
Dixon was born in Waterbury, Connecticut. She attended St. Margaret's School in Waterbury, and was also educated in France, where she studied dramatics under Sarah Bernhardt.

Career 
She made her Broadway stage debut in 1926, in a comedy melodrama called Wooden Kimono, and continued to perform there even after she retired from films. Her style of "brittle comedy" was seen in plays like June Moon (1929) by George S. Kaufman and Ring Lardner and Once in a Lifetime (1930) by Kaufman and Moss Hart. Her final Broadway performance was in the play The Gang's All Here in 1959-60.

Dixon made her screen debut in 1929 in The Lady Lies and appeared in 11 other films, including My Man Godfrey, before her final studio film, Holiday (1938), which starred Edward Everett Horton, Cary Grant and Katharine Hepburn. She continued to act on stage throughout the 1940s and 1950s and made some appearances in TV series and TV movies in the 1950s and in 1960.

Personal life 
In January 1936, Dixon eloped with Edward Stevenson Ely; they were married in Yuma, Arizona.

Selected filmography

References

External links

 
 Jean Dixon on the Internet Broadway Database

1893 births
1981 deaths
Actors from Waterbury, Connecticut
Actresses from Connecticut
American expatriates in France
American film actresses
American stage actresses
20th-century American actresses